Georgios Nikas (born 17 September 1999) is a Greek professional footballer who plays as a midfielder for Super League club Levadiakos.

Honours
Levadiakos
Super League 2: 2021–22

References

1999 births
Living people
Super League Greece players
Super League Greece 2 players
Levadiakos F.C. players
Association football midfielders
Footballers from Athens
Greek footballers